Alison Leary  is a Chair of Healthcare & Workforce Modelling at London South Bank University. She works on the modelling of private and public healthcare systems. She is a Fellow of the Royal College of Nursing and Queen's Nursing Institute.

Early life and education 
Leary studied natural sciences and graduated in 1986. She worked in engineering and biomedical sciences in the National Health Service for ten years before studying a Diploma of Higher Education in adult nursing at St Thomas' Hospital. In 1997 she was awarded a Master's degree in biomedical science at United Medical and Dental Schools of Guy's and St Thomas' Hospitals. She became a registered nurse (RN) in 1996. She earned a Master's degree in haemato-oncology and doctoral degree in at the University of London in 2006. She has since completed an advanced study program in data science and leadership at Massachusetts Institute of Technology.

Research and career 
Leary spent most of her clinical and analyst career in cancer, and worked with the National Cancer Action Team from 2005 to its dissolution in 2013 as part of the Lansley reforms. She was subsequently appointed a Chair in Healthcare and Workforce Modelling at the London South Bank University in 2014. She is interested in the complexity of healthcare and ways to use non-linear mathematics to model hospital staffing and outcomes. She has argued that the healthcare workforce should be evaluated based on outcomes, rather than outputs. This could be achieved through improving staff working conditions and pay, as well as streamlining immigration processes for shortage occupations. Leary believes that better planning could greatly improve the healthcare system, focussing on better understanding demand and risk. She has questioned the protection of the job title of nurse, emphasising that it is important to use it only for the highly trained specialists within the National Health Service. She has previously held the position of Chief Nursing Officer to St John Ambulance.

She has supported the idea of bringing more men into nursing to mitigate for the staff shortfall, but could exacerbate current equality issues within the nursing profession. Leary studied the gender pay gap in nursing, and found that male nurses reached higher paying posts more quickly and were overrepresented at higher pay grades. In 2016 she was awarded a Winston Churchill Memorial Trust Fellowship to study the use of big data in high reliability organisations. This position allowed her to compare healthcare with other safety critical industries in Switzerland and the United States of America.

Leary served as the clinical lead at Millwall Football Club. In this capacity she helped the football club deploy emergency healthcare, and studied what roles are required for the most effective response team. Her research on the effectiveness of medical teams is part of Millwall F.C.'s new approach to healthcare services, which can accommodate disasters as well as minor injuries, spectator safety and primary care. This work was included in the Sports Safety Ground Authority's 2018 guide, which sets benchmarking standards in British football grounds. She stood down after 23 years. She is a member of the TED Whitehall Women expert group.

She has served as non-executive director of several charities, including the National Lung Cancer Forum for Nurses, the Millwall Community Scheme. and the British Association of Immediate Care

Awards and honours 

 2012 Mayor of Southwark Civic Award
2013 Florence Nightingale Foundation Leadership Scholar
2014 Nursing Times Leaders list 
2014 Health Service Journal Inspirational Women
 2015 Elected Fellow of the Royal College of Nursing
 2016 Elected Fellow of the Queen's Nursing Institute
2018 Top 70 women in health in 70 years of the NHS
 2019 Appointed an MBE in the 2019 Birthday Honours

Selected publications 
Her publications include:

References 

Living people
Nurses from London
British women academics
Fellows of the Royal College of Nursing
Year of birth missing (living people)
Members of the Order of the British Empire
Alumni of the University of London
Academics of London South Bank University
British nurses